This is a list of forests and woodland in Lincolnshire, England.

Lincolnshire
Forests and woodlands of Lincolnshire